Donald R Palmer (1927 – 1 November 1980) was an Australian rower. He competed in the men's coxless pair event at the 1952 Summer Olympics.

References

1927 births
1980 deaths
Australian male rowers
Olympic rowers of Australia
Rowers at the 1952 Summer Olympics
Rowers from Sydney
20th-century Australian people